The following lists events that happened during 2015 in the Federal Democratic Republic of Nepal.

Incumbents
President: Ram Baran Yadav 
Prime Minister: Sushil Koirala 
Vice President: Parmanand Jha
Chief Justice: Ram Kumar Prasad Shah (until 7 July), Kalyan Shrestha (starting 7 July)

Events

January
 January 5 - Introduction of separate buses for women.

March
 March 4 - Turkish Airlines Flight TK726, landing in dense fog in Kathmandu, skids off a slippery runway, however, there are no serious injuries.

April
In total, at least 10,000 people were killed in Nepal, India, Bangladesh, and China.

May 
 May 12 - A magnitude 7.3 earthquake with the epicenter at Dolakha kills at least 66 people in Nepal.

October 
 October 29 -Bidhya Devi Bhandari first Nepalese woman President to hold the office.

Deaths
 Surya Bahadur Thapa, five times Prime Minister
 Bharat Raj Upreti, 64, Nepali judge, justice of the Supreme Court (2009–2013), suicide by hanging.

References

 
Nepal
Years of the 21st century in Nepal
2010s in Nepal
Nepal